CUSD is an acronym used to refer to the following school districts:

 Cambridge University Social Democrats
 Capistrano Unified School District
 Carlsbad Unified School District
 Central Unified School District
 Chandler Unified School District
 Chico Unified School District
 Chinle Unified School District
 Chino Valley Unified School District (disambiguation), multiple districts
 Claremont Unified School District
 Clovis Unified School District
 Coronado Unified School District
 Cupertino Union School District